Sarah Kennedy (born January 27, 1948) is an American actress who appeared in many popular television shows during the 1970s and early 1980s, including Rowan & Martin's Laugh-In.  She was also an occasional guest on Match Game and The Tonight Show, and appeared in films such as The Telephone Book (1971) and The Working Girls (1974).

Early life
Born and raised in Coquille, Oregon, Kennedy graduated from Coquille High School and attended Oregon State University and San Francisco State University. Her first job was as a receptionist at a talent agency in New York City, which led to many commercial and acting roles.

Filmography

Film

Television

References

External links

1948 births
Living people
American television actresses
Place of birth missing (living people)
People from Coquille, Oregon
21st-century American women